The 2003 Nigerian House of Representatives elections in Kwara State was held on April 12, 2003, to elect members of the House of Representatives to represent Kwara State, Nigeria.

Overview

Summary

Results

Asa/Ilorin West 
PDP candidate Ogundairo S. Ajibade won the election, defeating other party candidates.

Baruten/Kaiama 
ANPP candidate Maimunat Adaji won the election, defeating other party candidates.

Edu/Moro/Patigi 
PDP candidate Yunusa Y. Ahmed won the election, defeating other party candidates.

Ekiti/Isin/Irepodun/Oke-ero 
PDP candidate Makanjuola G.P won the election, defeating other party candidates.

Ilorin East/South 
PDP candidate Z.O. Edun won the election, defeating other party candidates.

Offa/Oyun/Ifelodun 
ANPP candidate O.A. Adebola Oyedele won the election, defeating other party candidates.

References 

Kwara State House of Representatives elections